Relaxed & Remixed is a remix album released by UK duo Lighthouse Family on 24 November 2004 on Wildcard / Polydor.

It contains remixes and acoustic versions of previously released singles, as well as the non-album B-side "From a Desert to a Beach".

Track listing

2004 remix albums
Lighthouse Family albums
Polydor Records remix albums
Albums produced by Mike Peden